The Cyclopædia; or, Universal Dictionary of Arts, Sciences, and Literature is an important 19th century British encyclopaedia edited by Rev. Abraham Rees (1743–1825), a Presbyterian minister and scholar who had edited previous editions of Chambers's Cyclopædia. Many major scholars of the day contributed. Scientific theorising about the atomic system, geological succession, and earth origins; natural history (botany, entomology, ornithology and zoology); and developments In technology, particularly In textiles manufacture, are all reflected in the Cyclopædia.
Serially published from 1802 to 1820, the Cyclopædia was criticised for its idiosyncratic topic selection and alphabetisation standards. Hostile reviews in the Anti-Jacobin Review (1802–1805) complained about its supposed antireligious aspects and radical standpoints attributed to its editor and contributors, and cited lack of article balance, confusing alphabetisation, and cross-references to then-unpublished volumes. The British Critic less stridently criticised lack of balance and confusion. The Quarterly Review commented in 1863, "Rees is the most extensive cyclopædia in English with many excellent articles it has generally been condemned as on the whole too diffuse and too commonplace." In 1948 Percy Scholes published his biography The Great Dr Burney, 2 vol., and devoted a chapter to Charles Burney's work for Rees, discussing in some detail the faults of the work, in particular, the way the serial production caused major problems when editors were faced with new knowledge that appeared after the volume containing the appropriate section had been issued. They addressed this partially with an appendix in the last volume.

The Rees Project, was instigated by Professor June Zimmerman Fullmer, who independently indexed the Cyclopædia. After tapping the invisible college of scholars who knew of Rees, she convened a summer 1986 meeting in London, following which she wrote a proposal to the American Foundation for the Humanities for funding to the project, setting out the object of producing a printed concordance to the contents of the Cyclopædia. This was intended to make Rees much more widely accessible to the modern reader. Funding was not forthcoming, and the matter lapsed.

The Cyclopædia lacks a classified index volume. In 1820, Philosophical Magazine analysed the work's contents by half-volume publication dates, as proper priority had not been given to serially published scientific discoveries. The following are notable topics covered by the Cyclopædia (containing over 15 columns).

Notes: In the original Cyclopædia, the letters I and J are treated as identical, as are U and V, following ancient Latin conventions; each pair forms one sequence in the alphabetical order of the articles. Two-year dating of volumes indicates separate publication dates for half-volumes. Contributors' names have been attributed based on the 1820 analysis.

Volume 1
A – Amaranthides Vol 1, 1802

Volume 2
Amarantus – Arteriotomy Vol 2, 1802/3

Volume 3
Artery – Battersea Vol 3, 1803/4

Volume 4
Battery – Bookbinding Vol 4, 1804/5

Volume 5
Book-keeping – Calvart Vol 5, 1805

Volume 6
Calvary – Castra Vol 6, 1806

Volume 7
Castramentation – Chronology Vol 7, 1806/7

Volume 8
Chronometer – Colliseum Vol 8, 1807

Volume 9
Collision – Corne Vol 9, 1807/8

Volume 10
Cornea – Czyrcassy Vol 10, 1808

Volume 11
D – Dissimilitude Vol 11, 1808

Volume 12
Dissimulation – Eloane Vol 12, 1809

Volume 13
Elocution – Extremities Vol 13, 1809

Volume 14
Extrinsic – Food Vol 14, 1810

Volume 15
Food – Generation Vol 15, 1810

Volume 16
Generation – Gretna Green Vol 16, 1810–11

Volume 17
Gretry – Hibe Vol 17, 1811

Volume 18
Hibiscus – Increment Vol 18, 1811

Volume 19
Increments – Kilmes Vol 19, 1811

Volume 20
Kiln – Light Vol 20, 1812

Volume 21
Light-house – Machinery Vol 21, 1812

Volume 22
Machinery – Mattheson Vol 22, 1812

Volume 23
Matthew – Monsoon Vol 23, 1812/3

Volume 24
Monster – Newton-in-the-Willows Vol 24, 1813

Volume 25
Newtonian Philosophy – Ozunusze Vol 25, 1813

Volume 26
P – Perturbation Vol 26, 1813/4

Volume 27
Pertussis – Poetics Vol 27, 1814

Volume 28
Poetry – Punjoor Vol 28, 1814

Volume 29
Punishment – Repton Vol 29, 1814/5

Volume 30
Republic – Rzemien Vol 30, 1815

Volume 31
S – Scotium Vol 31, 1815

Volume 32
Scotland – Sindy Vol 32, 1815/6

Volume 33
Sines – Starboard Vol 33, 1816

Volume 34
Starch – Szydlow Vol 34, 1816

Volume 35
T – Toleration Vol 35, 1817

Volume 36
Tolerium – Vermelho Vol 36, 1817

Volume 37
Vermes – Waterloo Vol 37, 1817/8

Volume 38
Water – Wzetin Vol 38, 1818

Volume 39
X – Zytomiers with Addenda and Corrigenda Vol 39, 1818–20

See also
List of long biographical articles on Rees's Cyclopaedia

References



English-language encyclopedias
Rees's Cyclopædia